Adolfo Díaz Recinos (15 July 1875 in Alajuela, Costa Rica – 29 January 1964 in San José, Costa Rica) served as the President of Nicaragua between 9 May 1911 and 1 January 1917 and again between 14 November 1926 and 1 January 1929. Born in Costa Rica to Nicaraguan parents in 1875, he worked as a secretary for the La Luz y Los Angeles Mining Company, an American company chartered in Delaware that owned the large gold mines around Siuna in eastern Nicaragua. In this capacity, he helped channel funds to the revolt against Liberal President José Santos Zelaya, who had incurred the anger of the United States by negotiating with Germany and Japan to resurrect the proposed Nicaragua Canal. 

Díaz became Vice President of Nicaragua in 1910. After he became president in 1911, Díaz was forced to rely on U.S. Marines to put down a Liberal revolt, which resulted in a contingent of Marines remaining in Nicaragua for over a decade. In return, in 1914, he signed the Bryan–Chamorro Treaty, which granted the United States exclusive rights to build an inter-oceanic canal across Nicaragua.

After his term as president ended, Díaz briefly lived in the United States. However, he returned to the presidency in 1926, after a coup by General Emiliano Chamorro (following the withdrawal of the Marines) failed to win U.S. support. During his second term as president, another Liberal revolt occurred. The Liberal forces were on the verge of seizing Managua when the U.S. forced the warring parties to accept a power-sharing agreement, the Espino Negro accord. One Liberal commander, Augusto Sandino, rejected the agreement and waged a guerrilla war against the U.S. Marines, who remained in the country to prop up Díaz's government and enforce the Espino Negro accord. In 1928, after elections supervised by the Marines, Díaz was replaced as president by former Liberal General José Maria Moncada. Afterwards, he acquired control of several of Nicaragua's gold mines, which had been destroyed during raids by Sandino's forces. He unsuccessfully tried to restore mining operations for the La Luz Company, until they sold their holdings to the Nevada-based Tonopah Mining Company.

In 1936, after Anastasio Somoza García seized power, Díaz took up permanent residency in the United States. He lived in the U.S. for more than a decade, primarily in New York City but also in Miami and New Orleans, before moving to Costa Rica, where he died in 1964.

References

External links 
Adolfo Díaz papers, Tulane University/Latin American Library

1875 births
1964 deaths
People from Alajuela
Presidents of Nicaragua
Nicaraguan expatriates in the United States
People of the Banana Wars
Vice presidents of Nicaragua
Conservative Party (Nicaragua) politicians